The Trick is a 2021 British television film directed by Pip Broughton and produced by Adrian Bate. It aired on BBC One on 18 October 2021. The film is a dramatisation of the Climatic Research Unit email controversy.

Cast
Jason Watkins as Phil Jones
Victoria Hamilton as Ruth Jones
George MacKay as Sam Bowen
Jerome Flynn as Neil Wallis
Aneirin Hughes as Trevor Davies
Ade Edmondson as Edward Acton
Pooky Quesnel as Stella Acton
Tara Divina as DS Anita Suppiah
Rhashan Stone as Gareth Ellman
Justin Salinger as DSI Julian Gregory
David Calder as Sir David King
Andrew Dunn as Graham Stringer

Reception
On the review aggregator website Rotten Tomatoes, there were four critics' reviews with an average rating of 60%. The Daily Telegraphs Anita Singh gave the film a rating of two out of five stars, concluding that the attempts to force the story to be a thriller fell flat. The Independents Ed Cumming found the characters boring and also rated the film two out of five stars. The New Scientists Elle Hunt wrote that the film was lacking in action, but felt that the filmmakers deserved kudos nonetheless for tackling such an important story.

References

Climate change films
Films based on actual events